Sheep is a horror novel by British author Simon Maginn, originally published in 1994 and reissued in 1997. It is now out of print. The book provided the basis for the 2005 film The Dark, although the plot changed drastically in the conversion from book to film. It was Maginn's debut novel.

Plot
A young family moves to rural Wales to renovate a farmhouse and recover from the drowning death of their daughter, Ruthie. While there, the family witnesses a series of terrible mutilations of sheep by an unknown perpetrator.

Editions
Paperback, Corgi, 1994. 
Hardbound, Severn House, 1995. 
Paperback, White Wolf, 1997.

References

External links
Sheep at FantasticFiction

1994 British novels
British horror novels
British novels adapted into films
Novels set in Wales
Corgi books